The undead are beings in mythology, legend, or fiction that are deceased but behave as if alive. Most commonly the term refers to corporeal forms of formerly-alive humans, such as mummies, vampires, and zombies, who have been reanimated by supernatural means, technology, or disease. In some cases (for example in Dungeons & Dragons) the term also includes incorporeal forms of the dead, such as ghosts.

The undead are featured in the belief systems of most cultures, and appear in many works of fantasy and horror fiction. The term is also occasionally used for real-life attempts to resurrect the dead with science and technology, from early experiments like Robert E. Cornish's to future sciences such as "chemical brain preservation" and "cryonics."

History 

Bram Stoker considered using the title, The Un-Dead, for his novel Dracula (1897), and use of the term in the novel is mostly responsible for the modern sense of the word. The word does appear in English before Stoker but with the more literal sense of "alive" or "not dead", for which citations can be found in the Oxford English Dictionary. In one passage of Dracula, Nosferatu is given as an "Eastern European" synonym for "un-dead".

Stoker's use of the term "undead" refers only to vampires; the extension to other types of supernatural beings arose later. Most commonly, it is now taken to refer to supernatural beings who had at one point been alive and continue to display some aspects of life after death, but the usage is highly variable.

Reanimation or the creation of zombies through non-supernatural means has become a trope since at least the 19th century. Frankenstein (1818) used unspecified technological means, the influential I Am Legend (1954)  blamed a germ, The Return of the Living Dead (1985) depicted a toxic gas, and Resident Evil (2002) featured a bioweapon.

The undead have become popular adversaries in fantasy and horror settings, featuring prominently in many role-playing games, role-playing video games, MMORPGs and strategy games.

Literature 

In Bram Stoker's novel Dracula, Van Helsing describes the Un-Dead as the following:

Other notable 19th-century stories about the avenging undead included Ambrose Bierce's The Death of Halpin Frayser, and various Gothic Romanticism tales by Edgar Allan Poe. Though their works could not be properly considered zombie fiction, the supernatural tales of Bierce and Poe would prove influential on later writers such as H. P. Lovecraft, by Lovecraft's own admission. In Russia, the undead was the theme of Alexander Belyaev's novel Professor Dowell's Head (1925), in which a mad scientist performs experimental head transplants on bodies stolen from the morgue, and reanimates the corpses.

List of undead forms

Physical corpses 

 Anchimayen
 Ahkiyyini
 Draugr
 Drekavac
 Deildegast
 Dhampir
 Fext
 Ghoul
 Gashadokuro
 Gjenganger
 Hone-onna
 Jiangshi
 Kukudh
 Lich
 Langsuyar
 Mummy
 Nachzehrer
 Qutrub
 Revenant
 Ro-langs
 Orek
 Skeleton
 Rusalka
 Strzyga
 Vampire
 Vrykolakas
 Vetala
 Wight
 Wiedergänger
 Zombie
 Zombie animal

Incorporeal spirits (Non-physical) 

 Ayakashi
 Banshee
 Baykok
 Bal-Bal
 Bhoot
 Dullahan
 Dunnie
 Funayūrei
 Ghost, phantom, or spectre
 Goryō
 Hupia
 Hitodama
 Headless Horseman
 Inugami
 Ikiryō
 The Grim Reaper
 Jikininki
 Korean Virgin Ghost
 Kuntilanak
 Kuchisake-onna
 Lemures
 Lietuvēns
 Mavka
 Moroi
 Mononoke
 Mogwai
 Myling
 Noppera-bō
 Onryō
 Poltergeist
 Pocong
 Preta
 Sluagh
 Shade
 Shiryō
 Shikigami
 Sayona
 Strigoi
 Shadow person
 Umibōzu
 Ubume
 Vengeful ghost
 Yūrei
 Yuki-onna
 Wraith

Mixed 
 Dying-and-rising deity

See also 

 Afterlife
 Death (personification)
 Grógaldr
 Immortality
 Necromancy
 Resurrection
 Spirit possession
 True death

References

External links 

 
 

 
Paranormal terminology
Demons